My Little Bride is a 2004 South Korean romantic comedy film about an arranged marriage between a female high school student (Moon Geun-young) and a male college student (Kim Rae-won). With 3,149,500 tickets sold, it was the second most popular domestic film at the Korean box office in 2004 (behind blockbuster Taegukgi), and fourth most popular overall.

My Little Bride is a Korean remake of the 2002 Hong Kong film My Wife Is 18, starring Charlene Choi and Ekin Cheng.

Plot
Bo-eun (Moon Geun-young) is an ordinary 15-year-old high school girl who worries about grades and has a crush on her school's baseball team ace, Jung-woo. One day, Bo-eun's grandfather orders her to marry Sang-min (Kim Rae-won) because of a pact he made with Sang-min's grandfather during the Korean War. Despite the grandchildren's opposition, they are forced to marry because of Bo-eun's grandfather's strong influence. However, later on in the story, it is revealed that Sang-min actually loves Bo-eun. Bo-eun's undercover married life begins: She pretends that she doesn't have a husband and starts dating Jung-woo. And her only best friend cannot help but to be envious of Bo-eun as she also has a crush on Jung-woo. But Bo-eun believes that she can manage both men and live a double life. Everything goes smoothly until Sang-min becomes an art teacher at Bo-eun's school and the duo have to try to keep their marriage a secret. From there, their relationship begins to grow. After an incident, Bo-eun's family finds out about Jung-woo. After talking to her mother, Bo-eun finally realizes that she loves Sang-min. At the school festival she breaks up with Jung-woo and confesses her feelings to Sang-min in front of the whole school.

Cast
Moon Geun-young as Bo-eun
Kim Rae-won as Sang-min
Park Jin-woo as Lee Jung-woo
Shin Se-kyung as Hye-won, Bo-eun's friend
Ahn Sun-young as Teacher Kim
Kim Bo-kyung as Ji-soo
Kim In-moon as Bo-eun's grandfather
Song Ki-yoon as Bo-eun's father
Sunwoo Eun-sook as Bo-eun's mother
Han Jin-hee as Sang-min's father
Kim Hye-ok as Sang-min's mother
Yoon Chan  as Yong-joo
Ryu Deok-hwan as Dong-goo
Kim Han as Young-chul

Soundtrack
Childhood memories
My Love - Shim Eun-jin
Sad gratitude
Happy Time
Flirt
Sad Sang-min
Look at me - Park Se-ryung
First love
I don't know about love yet - Moon Geun-young
Mural of love
Shopping center
Letter
The clown is laughing at me - 공주파 3인
Confession at the auditorium
Epilogue
I don't know about love yet - Kim Hye-jin
I don't know about love yet - Jeon Woo-joo
I don't know about love yet (Inst.)
My Love (Inst.)

Release
My Little Bride was released in South Korea on April 2, 2004. In the Philippines, the film was released by Korea Pictures with a Tagalog dub on November 23, 2005.

Accolades

References

External links

2004 films
2004 romantic comedy films
2000s teen romance films
South Korean romantic comedy films
2000s teen films
2000s South Korean films
2000s Korean-language films